The Coombes, Hinton Parva is a 15.9 hectare biological Site of Special Scientific Interest in Wiltshire, notified in 1989.  The Coombes, made up of chalk grassland, is owned by the National Trust.

References

External links
 Natural England website (SSSI information)
 Natural England citation sheet for the site (accessed 24 March 2022)

Sites of Special Scientific Interest in Wiltshire
Sites of Special Scientific Interest notified in 1989